"Audience" is a song by Japanese recording artist Ayumi Hamasaki from her third studio album Duty (2000). It was released as the album's fifth and final single on 1 November 2000 by Avex Trax. Hamasaki wrote the track and Max Matsuura Lewis produced it. Dai Nagao and HΛL composed both the single and album version. The single artwork was shot by Japanese photographer Toru Kumazawa and features duplicate clones of Hamasaki, resembling an audience. Musically, "Audience" is a dance–pop and disco song.

"Audience" received positive reviews from music critics; many highlighted it from the parent album and her music career. It achieved lukewarm success in compare to her previous singles, with a peak position of number three on the Oricon Singles Chart and a gold certification by the Recording Industry Association of Japan (RIAJ). The single remains Hamasaki's twenty–seventh best selling single in Japan. No music video was shot for the single.

Background and composition

Ayumi Hamasaki's track "Audience" appeared on her third studio album, Duty (2000).  Hamasaki begun work on Duty and followed a similar musical concept like her first two albums A Song for ×× (January 1999) and Loveppears (November 1999). "Audience" was written by Hamasaki. Majority of the lyrics were about  loneliness, chaos, confusion, and the burden of her responsibilities, aimed mostly towards her public image as a recording artist. In contrast to "Audience", the trilogy singles focused on hopelessness, a reflection of Hamasaki's disappointment that she had not expressed herself thoroughly in any of her previous lyrics. She described her feelings after the writing as "unnatural" and was constantly "nervous" for the final result.

The song was recorded in mid–2000 in Tokyo, Japan. Max Matsuura produced both the single version and the album version, with additional production handling by Naoto Suzuki for the single version. HΛL played the keyboard, Suzuki played the guitar and all other instruments were handled by Dai Nagao. "Audience" is a dance song that employs elements of disco music.<ref name="cd">{{cite web|url=http://artist.cdjournal.com/d/duty/3200071069|title=Duty' by Hamasaki, Ayumi |work=CDJournal | access-date=28 February 2015 | date=22 March 2015}}</ref> In comparison, Duty was a rock–influenced album and "Audience" was the only dance track on the album.

"Audience" was her third song to incorporate an English–language phrase, alongside her single "Whatever" (February 1999) and the b–side to "Love (Destiny)", "Love: Since 1999" (May 1999). But because "Audience" and "Whatever" used one–worded phrases and "Love: Since 1999" was not written by Hamasaki, it does not count in using English–language conversation like she did in her 2002 album Rainbow.

Release and promotion
"Audience" was released on 1 November 2000 in CD format by Avex Trax, as the fifth single from Duty. The maxi single features over nine remixes, one instrumental and an a cappella of "Seasons". The cover sleeve features several clones of Hamasaki, representing an audience. The cover shoot was photographed by Japanese photographer Toru Kumazawa with a total off seven make–up and hair assistants. Shinichi Hara had directed the cover sleeve and has been Hamasaki's creative director for promotional work and began collaborating with her in 1998. His final work was directing the sleeve for Hamasaki's 2009 single "Sunrise/Sunset (Love Is All)". A digital release of the single was released in Australia, New Zealand, North America and the United Kingdom. A vinyl was released by Rhythm Republic Records and was distributed in Japan only. "Audience" has featured on three greatest hits compilation albums by Hamasaki including the white deluxe edition of A Best 2 (2007), A Complete: All Singles (2008) and A Summer Best (2012).

No music video was shot for the single. Only a video commercial for the single was aired in Japan. This became Hamasaki's first single to not feature a music video; her next single to not feature a music video was her 2001 single "Unite!".

Reception
"Audience" received favorable reviews from most music critics. Alexey Eremenko, who had written her extended biography at Allmusic, highlighted the song as an album and career stand out. A reviewer for CDJournal was positive towards the track, commending the production and calling it “fun” but “aggressive” Hamasaki hosted an online voting poll for fans to choose their favorite tracks to be featured on her Ayumi Hamasaki 15th Anniversary Tour  Best Live Tour. As a result, "Audience" were featured on the list.

"Audience" debuted at number three on the Japanese Count Down TV chart. The song was unable to pass Misia's single "Everything" and Southern All Stars' single "Blue in Green". It fell to number eight the next week. It fell to sixteen in its third week, and fell at number thirty and forty-six in its fourth and fifth week, respectively. The song fell outside the top fifty at number fifty-four and fell to seventy-nine. "Audience" debuted at number two on the Oricon Singles Chart and lasted eight weeks. In the 2000 annual Count Down TV chart, "Audience" was placed at ninety-two.

"Audience" was certified gold by the Recording Industry Association of Japan (RIAJ) for shipment of 200,000 units. "Audience" resulted in the lowest selling single off Duty, with only the lead "trilogy" singles selling over 500,000 units in Japan. Despite this result, "Audience" now remains Hamasaki's second best selling limited edition single to date with sales over 293,000 units, just behind "Fly High" which sold 300,000 units. "Audience" is her twenty–seventh best selling single.

Live performances
Hamasaki has performed "Audience" in all of her New Years countdown concerts up until the Ayumi Hamasaki Countdown Live 2006–2007 A, which became the song's last live performance at the countdown shows. Additionally, Hamasaki has performed "Audience" twice in her involvement with Avex Trax's concert A Nation, being performed in 2006 and the last performance being held in 2008.

"Audience" has also been featured on several of Hamasaki's national and international tours that has spread throughout many Asian territories. The song had made its debut tour performance on Hamasaki's 2001 Ayumi Hamasaki Dome Tour 2001 A. Ever since the song's debut performance, "Audience" has appeared on several of Hamasaki's arena tours including Ayumi Hamasaki Arena Tour 2002 A, 2002 Stadium Tour and 2005 My Story Tour. The song's last live performance was her 2014 Ayumi Hamasaki PREMIUM SHOWCASE: Feel the love, in which was supported by her 2014 studio album Colours''.

Personnel
Credits adapted from the single's liner notes.

Song credits
Ayumi Hamasaki – songwriting, vocal production
Dai Nagao – composition 
Yasuyuki Tomita – A&R
Shigeo Miyamoto – mastering, engineering
Shinji Hayashi – additional production
Max Matsuura – executive producer, vocal production, additional production

Cover credits
Shinichi Hara – art direction
Shigeru Kasai and Takuma Noriage – design
Naoki Ueda – creative coordinator
Toru Kumazawa – photographer
Koji Matsumoto – fashion director
Hiroyuki Ishii and Takako Mishima – stylist
CHIKA – hair assistant and make–up stylist
Kanako Miura – nail artist

Track listing
All lyrics written by Ayumi Hamasaki.

Charts, peaks and positions

Weekly charts

Certification

Release history

Notes

References

External links
 "Audience" information at Avex Network.

Ayumi Hamasaki songs
2000 singles
Songs written by Ayumi Hamasaki
Songs written by Dai Nagao
Disco songs